Acanthodica penicillum is a moth of the family Noctuidae. It is found in Central and South America, including Costa Rica, Guatemala and Brazil.

Catocalina
Moths of Central America
Moths of South America
Moths described in 1874